Ilan Qarah or Ilanqarah may refer to:
 Ilan Qarah-ye Olya
 Ilan Qarah-ye Sofla